Events in the year 1885 in music.

Specific locations
1885 in Norwegian music

Events 
October 25 – Johannes Brahms' Symphony No. 4 is premiered in Meiningen
Tin Pan Alley group of popular songwriters and publishers forms in New York City

Published popular music 

 "American Patrol"     m. F. W. Meacham
 "The Boy I Love is Up in the Gallery"     w.m. George Ware
 "Dars a Lock on de Chicken Coop Door" by Sam Lucas
 "Funny Things They Do Upon The Sly"     w. G. W. Hunter & John Cooke Jnr m. G. W. Hunter
 "Open Road"     Johann Strauss II
"Raise me, Jesus, to thy bosom," w. by George Birdseye, m. by William A.  Huntley
 "Saffi's Aria"     Johann Strauss II
 "Some Sweet Day" by Edward L. Park & William Howard Doane
 "This Is The House That Jerry Built"     w. T. S. Lonsdale m. W. G. Eaton
 "What Cheer 'Ria"     w. Will Herbert m. Bessie Bellwood
From the score of The Mikado:
"A More Humane Mikado" ("Let the Punishment fit the Crime")
"The Flowers That Bloom In The Spring"
"There Is Beauty In The Bellow Of The Blast"
"Three Little Maids From School"
"A Wand'ring Minstrel I"

Classical music 
Johannes Brahms – Symphony No. 4, Op. 98, in E minor
Anton Bruckner – Symphony No. 7
George Whitefield Chadwick – String Quartet No. 3 in D
Antonín Dvořák – Symphony No. 7, Op. 70, in D minor
Cesar Franck
 Symphonic Variations for piano and orchestra
 Danse lente for piano
Alexander Glazunov – Stenka Razin
 Camille Saint-Saëns – Violin Sonata No. 1
Jean Sibelius – String Quartet in E-flat
Richard Strauss
Piano Quartet in C minor, Op. 13
Concerto No. 1 in E-flat Major for horn and orchestra
Pyotr Ilyich Tchaikovsky – Manfred Symphony
José Vianna da Motta – Piano Concerto in A

Opera
Emmanuel Chabrier – Gwendoline
Fromental Halévy, completed by Georges Bizet – Noé given its first performance at Karlsruhe.
Jules Massenet – Le Cid
André Messager 
La fauvette du temple
La Béarnaise
Emile Pessard – Tabarin premiered on January 12 at the Théâtre de l'Opéra, Paris
Amilcare Ponchielli – Marion Delorme
George Stephanescu – Scaiul barbatilor

Musical theater

Edward Jakobowski – Erminie (libretto by Claxson Bellamy and Harry Paulton) London production
William S. Gilbert and Arthur Sullivan – The Mikado London production
Johann Strauss II – Der Zigeunerbaron (The Gypsy Baron) Vienna production

Births 
January 13 – James V. Monaco, Italian-born US composer (d. 1945)
January 27 – Jerome Kern, composer and songwriter (d. 1945)
February 9 – Alban Berg, composer (d. 1935)
February 12 – James Scott, ragtime composer (d. 1938)
February 16 – Will Fyffe, Scottish comedian and singer (d. 1947)
March 15 – Bertha Raffetto, American singer (d. 1952)
May 5 – Agustín Barrios, composer (d. 1944)
May 14 – Otto Klemperer, conductor and composer (d. 1973)
May 30 – Erna Ellmenreich, German operatic soprano (d. 1976)
June 13 – John Palm, Curaçao-born composer (d. 1925)
June 28 – Marino Capicchioni, Italian musical instrument maker (d. 1977)
July 12 – George Butterworth, composer (d. 1916)
July 17 – Benjamin Dale, composer (d. 1943)
August 9 – Pietro Frosini, accordionist (d. 1951)
October 15 – Therese Wiet, Austrian operetta singer (d. 1971)
October 21 – Egon Wellesz, Austrian composer (d. 1974)
October 25 – Sam M. Lewis, US lyricist (d. 1959)
December 19 – Joe "King" Oliver, jazz musician (d. 1938)

Deaths 
February 15 – Leopold Damrosch, conductor, 52 (complications from a cold)
March 31 – Franz Abt, composer, 65
April 24 – Henry Augustus Rawes, hymn-writer, 58
May – Adolphe Blanc, composer, 56
May 1 – Henry Brinley Richards, composer, 67
May 12 – Ferdinand Hiller, German composer, conductor and pianist, 73
June 29 – Samuel C. Upham, lyricist, 66
August 26 – August Gottfried Ritter, organist and composer, 74
September 11 – Julius Zarebski, Polish pianist and composer, 31
September 13 – Friedrich Kiel, German composer, 63
October 21 – Michele Novaro, songwriter, 66

References

 
19th century in music
Music by year